Rolf Günther Feltscher Martínez (born 6 October 1990) is a professional footballer who plays as defender for German club MSV Duisburg. Born in Switzerland, he represents the Venezuela national team.

Club career

Grasshoppers
Despite being just 16 years old, he was given his league debut in Grasshoppers's first match of the 2007–08 season, a 2–0 victory over FC St. Gallen, playing 90 minutes at right back. He was also a key member of the Switzerland U-17 team during the qualifying round of the 2007 UEFA U-17 Championship, playing in all three matches during that
round.

Parma
In November 2009, he signed a pre-contract with Parma and joined the Italian club after the end of season. He played for Parma's primavera in the 2011 edition of the Torneo di Viareggio, but made just two league starts and a substitute appearance for the first-team in his debut season. He made four appearances the following year.

Padova
In June 2012, Calcio Padova confirmed that Feltscher had signed on a loan deal from Parma with an option to buy for the year 2012–13.

Duisburg
He joined MSV Duisburg for the 2014–15 season.

Getafe
On 11 July 2016, Feltscher signed a two-year deal with Getafe CF in Segunda División. After being rarely used, he was loaned to fellow league team Real Zaragoza the following 31 January.

Cardiff City
In September 2017, Feltscher spent ten days on trial with EFL Championship side Birmingham City, being told that a potential permanent deal was "on the table". However, after Birmingham manager Harry Redknapp left his position, he was allowed to leave the club. Redknapp later recommended Feltscher to Neil Warnock, manager of fellow Championship club Cardiff City, and he spent several weeks on trial with Cardiff before signing an initial two-month contract on 16 November 2017. During his time at the club, he featured as unused substitute in two league matches but did not make a first-team appearance.

LA Galaxy
On 19 December 2017, Feltscher signed with Major League Soccer side LA Galaxy ahead of their 2018 season. He had seven games and seven starts until in April 2018 he was ruled out for four months with a broken shoulder. Feltscher was released by LA Galaxy at the end of their 2018 season. He was re-signed on 15 January 2019.

Würzburger Kickers
On 23 December 2020, Feltscher returned to Germany joining 2. Bundesliga side Würzburger Kickers.

Return to Duisburg
In June 2021, he signed for Duisburg, for the second time.

Personal life
He is the younger brother of Frank Feltscher and the elder step-brother of Mattia Desole.

Career statistics

Club

International

References

External links

Football.ch profile

Living people
1990 births
People from Bülach
Venezuelan footballers
Venezuela international footballers
Swiss men's footballers
Switzerland youth international footballers
Switzerland under-21 international footballers
Swiss people of Venezuelan descent
Swiss emigrants to Venezuela
People with acquired Venezuelan citizenship
Association football defenders
Swiss Super League players
Grasshopper Club Zürich players
FC Lausanne-Sport players
Serie A players
Serie B players
Parma Calcio 1913 players
Calcio Padova players
F.C. Grosseto S.S.D. players
2. Bundesliga players
3. Liga players
MSV Duisburg players
Segunda División players
Getafe CF footballers
Real Zaragoza players
Copa América Centenario players
Cardiff City F.C. players
English Football League players
LA Galaxy players
Würzburger Kickers players
Major League Soccer players
Swiss expatriate footballers
Venezuelan expatriate footballers
Venezuelan expatriate sportspeople in the United States
Swiss expatriate sportspeople in Italy
Swiss expatriate sportspeople in Germany
Swiss expatriate sportspeople in Spain
Venezuelan expatriate sportspeople in Italy
Venezuelan expatriate sportspeople in Germany
Venezuelan expatriate sportspeople in Spain
Venezuelan people of Swiss descent
Expatriate footballers in Italy
Expatriate footballers in Germany
Expatriate footballers in Spain
Expatriate soccer players in the United States
Sportspeople from the canton of Zürich